Sedgwick is a surname. Notable people with the surname include:

Academics
Adam Sedgwick (1785–1873), British geologist
Adam Sedgwick (1854–1913), British zoologist
Eve Kosofsky Sedgwick (1950–2009), American queer theorist
Mark Sedgwick (born 1960), British historian of Arab and Islamic Studies
Leonard John Sedgwick (1883–1925), Indian botanist and civil servant
Romney Sedgwick (1895–1972), British historian, civil servant and diplomat
William Thompson Sedgwick (1855–1921), American biologist

Performers
Edie Sedgwick (1943–1971), American actress and model
Edward Sedgwick (1892–1953), American movie director, writer, actor and producer
Eileen Sedgwick (1898–1991), American actress, sister of Edward
Kyra Sedgwick (born 1965), American actress
Robert Sedgwick American actor
Toby Sedgwick (born 1958),  British theatre director, actor and choreographer

Politicians
Charles B. Sedgwick (1815–1883), US Representative from New York
Henry J. Sedgwick (1812–1868), New York politician
Theodore Sedgwick (1746–1813), Senator

Sportspeople
Bill Sedgwick (born 1955), NASCAR driver
Cam Sedgwick (born 1978), lacrosse player
Chris Sedgwick (born 1980), footballer
Herbert Sedgwick (1883–1957), cricketer

Theologians
Obadiah Sedgwick (1599/1600–1658), Puritan divine
Thomas Sedgwick (died 1573), Catholic theologian and martyr
Timothy F. Sedgwick, academic and theologian
William Sedgwick (bishop) (1858–1948), New Zealand bishop

Writers
Anne Douglas Sedgwick (1873–1935), writer
Catharine Sedgwick (1789–1867), writer
Ellery Sedgwick (1872–1960), editor
Henry Dwight Sedgwick (1861–1957), lawyer and writer
Marcus Sedgwick (born 1968), author and illustrator
Peter Sedgwick (1934–1983), socialist activist and writer
Theodore Sedgwick (writer) (1811–1859), writer

Others
John Sedgwick (1813–1864), American Civil War general
Joseph Sedgwick (1898–1981), lawyer
Robert Sedgwick (1611–1656), Colonist
Samuel H. Sedgwick (1848–1919), Justice of the Nebraska Supreme Court
Steve Sedgwick (public servant), (born 1950) Australian senior public servant

See also
 Sedgwick family, the American branch of the family started by Robert Sedgwick

English toponymic surnames